Qazı  is a traditional sausage-like food of Kazakhs, Tatars, Kyrgyz, Uzbeks and other Turkic or Central Asian ethnic groups. It is a common element on a dastarkhan, a table set for a festive meal. A reviewer from VICE Magazine described the dish as smoky and earthy. Horse meat is usually used for Qazı.

Preparation
The horse's ribs are removed, along with the meat, and hung for 5–7 hours to drain any remaining blood. The intestines are removed and thoroughly washed, and then brined for 1–2 hours. The meat from the ribs is salted, seasoned with pepper and garlic and left tied in a cloth for 2–3 hours. Then, the intestines are filled with the meat and the two ends are tied. After this preparation, the qazı can either be smoked at 50–60° Celsius for 12–18 hours, or dried outdoors for a week in a place exposed to direct sun and wind.

Before serving, the qazı is boiled in water for two hours. The cooked qazı is then sliced into one centimetre-thick pieces and served with onion and seasonal vegetables.

Serving 

Qazı is often eaten cold, sometimes sliced and served as an appetizer. In Uzbekistan it is often served with plov, and in Kazakhstan can be added to beshbarmak.  

In mountainous regions, qazı may be made with venison.

See also 
 Sundae
 Beshbarmak
 Sujuk
 Qarta
 Kazakh cuisine
 Kyrgyz cuisine
 Tatar cuisine
 List of sausage dishes

References

Kazakhstani cuisine
Uzbekistani cuisine
Tatar cuisine
Bashkir cuisine
Sausages